Curtis Liam Thompson (born 2 September 1993) is an English professional footballer who plays as a midfielder for  club Wycombe Wanderers.

Career
Born in Nottingham, Thompson started his career at the age of 12 when he signed for Leicester City. He played for the club for four years before he was released in 2009 after not being offered a scholarship. He subsequently signed a two-year scholarship with Notts County. In summer 2011, he signed an 18-month professional contract. He made his professional debut on 4 October 2011, in a 3–1 defeat to Chesterfield in the Football League Trophy, replacing Mike Edwards as a substitute. On 21 October 2011, he joined Conference Premier side Lincoln City, under the caretaker-manager Grant Brown, on an initial one-month youth loan, debuting later that day as an 88th-minute substitute for Josh O'Keefe in the club's 2–0 league defeat at Cambridge United. This was Thompson's only appearance for the club as three days later David Holdsworth was appointed manager of the Red Imps and he elected to cut-short Thompson's loan.

In November 2012, he joined Ilkeston on a one-month loan deal.

On 26 January 2018, Thompson joined Wycombe Wanderers on loan until the end of the 2017–18 season.

He was released by Notts County at the end of the 2017–18 season.

On 14 July 2018 before the kick-off of a pre-season friendly against West Ham United, it was announced Thompson had signed a five-month contract with League One club Wycombe Wanderers after a short loan spell at the end of the previous season. On 4 January 2019, Thompson signed a new two-and-a-half year contract with Wycombe until 2021. He was awarded the Players' Player of the Year Award for the 2018/19 season.

Career statistics

Honours
Wycombe Wanderers
EFL League One play-offs: 2020

References

External links
. Note that this has incorrect data for Thompson's career with Lincoln City. The seven appearances from 29 November 2011 – 1 January 2012 should be attributed to Tyrone Thompson.

1993 births
Living people
Footballers from Nottingham
English footballers
Association football midfielders
Notts County F.C. players
Lincoln City F.C. players
Ilkeston F.C. players
Wycombe Wanderers F.C. players
National League (English football) players
English Football League players